Hilarographa gunongana is a species of moth of the family Tortricidae. It is found in Sarawak.

The wingspan is about 8.5 mm.

Etymology
The name refers to the type locality.

References

Moths described in 2009
Hilarographini